Javorina was a military district in the Kežmarok District in northern Slovakia, in the Levoča Hills. Its area is 316.24 km² and has no permanent population.

History
The military district was created in 1952. It was created from the whole cadastral area of four villages (Blažov, Dvorce, Ruskinovce, Ľubické Kúpeľe) and from partial cadastral area of another 22 villages. The district was dissolved in 2011.

Genealogical resources

The records for genealogical research are available at the state archive "Statny Archiv in Levoca, Presov, Slovakia"

 Roman Catholic church records (births/marriages/deaths): 1838-1896 (parish B)
 Greek Catholic church records (births/marriages/deaths): 1812-1899 (parish B)

See also
 List of municipalities and towns in Slovakia

External links
 https://web.archive.org/web/20070513023228/http://www.statistics.sk/mosmis/eng/run.html
Surnames of living people in Javorina

Villages and municipalities in Kežmarok District